Provincial road N201 is a Dutch provincial road.

See also

References

External links

201
201
201